Oleksandr Oleksandrovych Holokolosov (Александр Голоколосов, Russian Romanization: Alexander Golokolosov, born 28 January 1976) is a former Ukrainian footballer. He also known as Golo in Spain.

Since 2006 Holokolosov worked as a scout for various clubs of the Ukrainian Premier League.

External links

1976 births
Living people
Ukrainian footballers
Ukrainian expatriate footballers
FC Hoverla Uzhhorod players
FC Nyva Vinnytsia players
FC Dynamo-2 Kyiv players
FC Volyn Lutsk players
FC Chornomorets Odesa players
Albacete Balompié players
Expatriate footballers in Spain
FK Dubnica
Slovak Super Liga players
Expatriate footballers in Slovakia
Footballers from Odesa
Ukrainian expatriate sportspeople in Spain
Ukrainian expatriate sportspeople in Slovakia
Association football forwards